LCX may refer to:

 Left circumflex artery
 IATA code for Longyan Guanzhishan Airport